Mercedonius (Latin for "Work Month"), also known as Mercedinus, Interkalaris or Intercalaris, was the intercalary month of the Roman calendar. The resulting leap year was either 377 or 378 days long. It theoretically occurred every two (or occasionally three) years, but was sometimes avoided or employed by the Roman pontiffs for political reasons regardless of the state of the solar year. Mercedonius was eliminated by Julius Caesar when he introduced the Julian calendar in 45 BC.

History
This month, instituted according to Roman tradition by Numa Pompilius, was supposed to be inserted every two or three years to align the conventional 355-day Roman year with the solar year. 

The decision of whether to insert the intercalary month was made by the pontifex maximus, supposedly based on observations to ensure the best possible correspondence with the seasons. Unfortunately the pontifex maximus, who would normally be an active politician, often manipulated the decision to allow friends to stay in office longer or force enemies out early.  Such unpredictable intercalation meant that dates following the month of Februarius could not be known in advance, and further to this, Roman citizens living outside Rome would often not know the current date.

The exact mechanism is not clearly specified in ancient sources.  Some scholars, such as Ludwig Ideler, Henry G Liddell, the staff writers of Encyclopædia Britannica and Elias Bickerman  hold that in intercalary years February's length was fixed at 23 days and it was followed by a variable length mensis intercalaris with 27 or 28 days.   This view is followed in generalist surveys of calendrical history such as those of D E Duncan, G R Richards or A Aveni.

However, following a discussion of intercalation in A. K. Michels, The Calendar of the Roman Republic (Princeton, 1967) 145–172, the standard reference on the pre-Julian calendar, some specialist studies of the pre-Julian calendar published since 1967  claim that in intercalary years Februarius was set at either 23 or 24 days, and followed by an intercalary month of 27 days.   Whichever interpretation is correct, the days a.d. VI Kal. Mart. to Prid. Kal. Mart., normally referring to the end of February, were in intercalary years the concluding days of the mensis intercalaris.

The month was eliminated by Julius Caesar when he introduced the Julian calendar in 46 BC.

See also
Julian calendar § Motivation
Adar
Undecimber

Notes

References

External links
Roman Dates

Months
Months of the Roman calendar